Ronald Albert Low (born June 21, 1950) is a Canadian former ice hockey goaltender and coach. He played in the National Hockey League with six teams between 1972 and 1985. After retiring he became a coach and was head coach of Edmonton Oilers from 1995 to 1999 and the New York Rangers from 2000 to 2002. Low grew up in Foxwarren, Manitoba.

Playing career
Low played for two years with the Dauphin Kings of the Manitoba Junior Hockey League (MJHL) before turning pro, leading the Kings to the Manitoba championship and the Memorial Cup playoffs each year.

Originally selected in the 1970 NHL Amateur Draft by the Toronto Maple Leafs, Low only played one season with Toronto before he was left exposed in the 1974 NHL Expansion Draft where he was claimed by the Washington Capitals. He spent three seasons with the Capitals and was the first goalie to get a shutout for the team on February 16, 1975 against the Kansas City Scouts.

After being traded to and spending two seasons in the Detroit Red Wings organization, he was claimed by the Quebec Nordiques in the 1979 NHL Expansion Draft. Low was traded to the Edmonton Oilers after playing only 15 games with the Nordiques. He was traded to the New Jersey Devils in 1983, where he completed his NHL career at the end of the 1984–85 NHL season.

Coaching career
After playing six games with the Nova Scotia Oilers of the American Hockey League, he became an assistant coach for the team. During the 1987 season, Low was promoted to assistant coach with the Edmonton Oilers. In 1988, become the head coach of the Nova Scotia Oilers and would remain in that position until 1989 when the team was renamed the Cape Breton Oilers. In 1990, Low was named an assistant coach with the Edmonton Oilers. Seven years later he became the head coach of the Oilers, a position he held for four seasons. After coaching the Houston Aeros for a season, he was named the head coach of the New York Rangers; however, his tenure would last for only two seasons as the team's dismal performance led to regular chants of Low must go! at home games as the 2001-2002 season's second half wore on. At the time of his dismissal by general manager Glen Sather, the Rangers under Low had a combined record of 69-81-9-5, finished 4th in the Atlantic Division both years and failed to qualify for the playoffs either year, marking a fifth consecutive year where the team failed to make the playoffs. After being relieved of his coaching duties with the Rangers, he would still remain in the organization as a scout until 2004. During the summer of 2004, he became a scout and goaltender coach for the Ottawa Senators. In August 2007, Low was promoted to the position of assistant coach of the Ottawa Senators. He was fired from this position on February 27, 2008.

He won the Stanley Cup in 1987, and 1990 as an assistant coach with the Edmonton Oilers.

Personal life
On March 17, 2010 Low was mugged in downtown Calgary. He had just left after meeting with fellow former Oiler Dave Hunter when the attack occurred. Low was able to make it back to his hotel and call an ambulance which brought him to Foothills hospital where he required surgery to his organs damaged in the attack.

Career statistics

Regular season and playoffs

Coaching record

Awards and achievements
 Turnbull Cup MJHL Championships (1969 & 1970)
 EHL South Rookie of the Year (1971)
 CHL Second All-Star Team (1974)
 CHL First All-Star Team (1979)
 CHL Most Valuable Player (1979)
 NHL – Stanley Cup (Edmonton) (1987 & 1990)
 Honoured Member of the Manitoba Hockey Hall of Fame
 Only NHL goaltender to have coached two different NHL teams

See also
 List of NHL head coaches

References

External links
 
 Ron Low's profile at Hockey Draft Central
 Ron Low's biography at Manitoba Hockey Hall of Fame

1950 births
Living people
Canadian expatriate ice hockey players in the United States
Canadian ice hockey coaches
Canadian ice hockey goaltenders
Detroit Red Wings players
Edmonton Oilers coaches
Edmonton Oilers players
Ice hockey people from Manitoba
Kansas City Red Wings players
Dauphin Kings players
Moncton Alpines (AHL) players
New Jersey Devils players
New York Rangers coaches
New York Rangers scouts
Nova Scotia Oilers players
Ottawa Senators coaches
Ottawa Senators scouts
Quebec Nordiques players
Richmond Robins players
Stanley Cup champions
Syracuse Firebirds players
Toronto Maple Leafs draft picks
Toronto Maple Leafs players
Tulsa Oilers (1964–1984) players
Washington Capitals players
Wichita Wind players